Jonas Solberg Andersen (born March 8, 1981 in Sarpsborg, Norway) is a retired Norwegian professional ice hockey player.

Career statistics

Regular season and playoffs

International

External links

1981 births
Living people
Ice hockey players at the 2010 Winter Olympics
Leksands IF players
Norwegian expatriate ice hockey people
Norwegian ice hockey forwards
Olympic ice hockey players of Norway
People from Sarpsborg
Sparta Warriors players
Sportspeople from Viken (county)